Abdul Ahad Kharot  (born 1926) is an Afghan former footballer, who competed at the 1948 Summer Olympic Games, he also played for Mahmoudiyeh F.C.

References

External links
 

1926 births
Possibly living people
Afghan footballers
Olympic footballers of Afghanistan
Footballers at the 1948 Summer Olympics
Place of birth missing (living people)
Association football midfielders